Framed is a 1990 television movie directed by Dean Parisot and produced on Home Box Office (HBO). It was written by Gary Rosen. Jeff Goldblum and Kristin Scott Thomas star.

Plot
A painter (Jeff Goldblum) is accused of art forgery. He thinks his girlfriend (Kristin Scott Thomas) betrayed him, so it's time for revenge.

Production
Filming took place in Paris.

Airing
The film aired on HBO on June 24, 1990.

References

External links
 

1990 television films
1990 films
1990s crime comedy films
1990s English-language films
American films about revenge
American comedy television films
American crime comedy films
Crime television films
Films about art forgery
Films about fictional painters
Films directed by Dean Parisot
Films scored by William Olvis
Films set in Los Angeles
Films set in Paris
HBO Films films
1990s American films